Detroit Homecoming is an invitation-only event sponsored by Crain Communications and designed to enlist the efforts of Detroit natives in improving the city.  It began in 2014 with a commitment to be an annual event for at least 3 years.

The first Homecoming took place in September, 2014, with an invitation list focused on what the Detroit News described as, "the elite: billionaires, sports stars, company presidents, venture capitalists, journalists and entertainers."  Among the event's planned highlights was a conversation between DanGilbert and Warren Buffett entitled, "Why I’m Bullish on Detroit."

Interviewed during the Homecoming, Rachel Jacobs, a Detroit expat living in New York said, "Detroit doesn’t need ideas. It has phenomenal ideas. It needs doers," referring to her own organization, Detroit Nation, a web-based group of former Detroiters working to help their hometown.

References 

Organizations based in Detroit
Urban renewal
Organizations established in 2014
Economic development organizations in the United States
2014 establishments in Michigan